The 2020 season was the Arizona Cardinals' 101st in the National Football League, their 33rd in Arizona and their second under head coach Kliff Kingsbury. It was also the first full season since 1971 without the ownership of Bill Bidwill, who died during the 2019 season.

The team improved on their 5–10–1 record from the previous year beginning the season 6–3; however, despite that and acquiring All-Pro wide receiver DeAndre Hopkins midway through the season, the Cardinals suffered a late season collapse, losing five of their last seven games and missed the playoffs for the fifth consecutive season after losing to the rival Los Angeles Rams in Week 17. The Cardinals finished tied with the Chicago Bears for the last Wild Card spot, but lost the tiebreaker.

Roster changes

Free agents

Signings

Trades
 March 20: The Cardinals traded a second-round pick in the 2020 NFL Draft, a fourth-round pick in the 2021 NFL Draft and RB David Johnson to the Houston Texans for WR DeAndre Hopkins.

Draft

Notes
 The Cardinals will forfeit their fifth-round selection after selecting safety Jalen Thompson in the 2019 supplemental draft.
 The Cardinals traded their sixth-round selection to the Cleveland Browns in exchange for cornerback Jamar Taylor.
 The Cardinals acquired a 2020 sixth-round pick from the New England Patriots in exchange for offensive tackle Korey Cunningham.
 The Cardinals traded their 2020 second-round selection, as well as a fourth-round selection in the 2021 NFL Draft and running back David Johnson to the Houston Texans in exchange for wide receiver DeAndre Hopkins and a 2020 fourth-round selection.

Staff

Final roster

Preseason
The Cardinals' preseason schedule was announced on May 7, but was later cancelled due to the COVID-19 pandemic.

Regular season

Schedule
The Cardinals' 2020 schedule was announced on May 7.

{| class="wikitable" style="text-align:center"
|-
!style=""| Week
!style=""| Date
!style=""| Opponent
!style=""| Result
!style=""| Record
!style=""| Venue
!style=""| Recap
|-style="background:#cfc"
! 1
| September 13
| at San Francisco 49ers
| W 24–20
| 1–0
| Levi's Stadium
| Recap
|-style="background:#cfc"
! 2
| September 20
| Washington Football Team| W 30–15
| 2–0
| State Farm Stadium
| Recap
|-style="background:#fcc"
! 3
| September 27
| Detroit Lions
| L 23–26
| 2–1
| State Farm Stadium
| Recap
|-style="background:#fcc"
! 4
| October 4
| at Carolina Panthers
| L 21–31
| 2–2
| Bank of America Stadium
| Recap
|-style="background:#cfc"
! 5
| October 11
| at New York Jets
| W 30–10
| 3–2
| MetLife Stadium
| Recap
|-style="background:#cfc"
! 6
| 
| at Dallas Cowboys
| W 38–10
| 4–2
| AT&T Stadium
| Recap
|-style="background:#cfc"
! 7
| October 25
| Seattle Seahawks| W 37–34 
| 5–2
| State Farm Stadium
| Recap
|-
! 8
| colspan="6" | Bye
|-style="background:#fcc"
! 9
| November 8
| Miami Dolphins
| L 31–34
| 5–3
| State Farm Stadium
| Recap
|-style="background:#cfc"
! 10
| November 15
| Buffalo Bills
| W 32–30
| 6–3
| State Farm Stadium
| Recap
|-style="background:#fcc"
! 11
| 
| at Seattle Seahawks| L 21–28
| 6–4
| Lumen Field
| Recap
|-style="background:#fcc"
! 12
| November 29
| at New England Patriots
| L 17–20
| 6–5
| Gillette Stadium
| Recap
|-style="background:#fcc"
! 13
| December 6
| Los Angeles Rams| L 28–38
| 6–6
| State Farm Stadium
| Recap
|-style="background:#cfc"
! 14
| December 13
| at New York Giants
| W 26–7
| 7–6
| MetLife Stadium
| Recap
|-style="background:#cfc"
! 15
| December 20
| Philadelphia Eagles
| W 33–26
| 8–6
| State Farm Stadium
| Recap
|-style="background:#fcc"
! 16
| 
| San Francisco 49ers| L 12–20
| 8–7
| State Farm Stadium
| Recap
|-style="background:#fcc"
! 17
| January 3
| at Los Angeles Rams| L 7–18
| 8–8
| SoFi Stadium
| Recap
|}Notes Intra-division opponents are in bold''' text.

Game summaries

Week 1: at San Francisco 49ers

With the win, the Cardinals won their first game of the season for the first time since 2015 and the first time in an away game since 2010.

Week 2: vs. Washington Football Team

With this win, the Cardinals started 2-0 for the first time since 2015.

Week 3: vs. Detroit Lions

The Cardinals were seeking their win over the Lions since 2015.

Week 4: at Carolina Panthers

Week 5: at New York Jets

Week 6: at Dallas Cowboys
With the win, the Cardinals not only advanced to 4–2, they also won their first road MNF game since 1977.

Week 7: vs. Seattle Seahawks
 This was the Cardinals' first Sunday Night Football appearance since 2016, which was also against the Seahawks at home. This was the Cardinals' first home win over the Seahawks since 2012.

Week 9: vs. Miami Dolphins

Cardinals kicker Zane Gonzalez missed a game-tying 49-yard field goal.

Week 10: vs. Buffalo Bills

In the final seconds of game, Kyler Murray threw a game winning touchdown pass to wide receiver DeAndre Hopkins with two seconds left after he leaped over three defenders in the end zone to make the catch. The play came at the end of a game in which the Cardinals rallied from a 23–9 deficit early in the third quarter, and from a 30–26 deficit after Bills quarterback Josh Allen threw a touchdown pass to wide receiver Stefon Diggs with less than 40 seconds left.

With the win, the Cardinals improved to 6–3. This was the first time a successful game-winning Hail Mary catch in the fourth quarter was made since Aaron Rodgers threw one in a 2015 game against the Detroit Lions.

Week 11: at Seattle Seahawks

Week 12: at New England Patriots

Week 13: vs. Los Angeles Rams

Week 14: at New York Giants

Week 15: vs. Philadelphia Eagles

Week 16: vs. San Francisco 49ers

Week 17: at Los Angeles Rams

With the loss, the Cardinals went 3–6 in their last 9 games after starting 5–2.

Standings

Division

Conference

Notes

References

External links
 

Arizona
Arizona Cardinals seasons
Arizona Cardinals